Pulaski Heights is a section of the city of Little Rock, Arkansas, located in the north-central portion of the city. The area comprises two distinct neighborhoods representing an historic suburb dating from the 1890s that was among the first areas to be annexed into Little Rock.

Incorporated in 1905 and annexed to Little Rock in 1916, Pulaski Heights today remains among the more independent-minded areas of the city, with a strong sense of community in both its northern, upper-elevation portion (The Heights) and its southern, lower-elevation portion (Hillcrest). Throughout Pulaski Heights there curves a beautiful east–west thoroughfare, Kavanaugh Boulevard (including portions formerly known as Prospect Avenue), named for Williams Marmaduke Kavanaugh, a former Pulaski County judge and local journalist, businessman, and banker who was also a founder of the Little Rock Baseball Association. The lovely tree-lined boulevard passes by a number of shops and boutiques unique to Little Rock, as well as such historic buildings and locations as the former Pulaski Heights Town Hall, the former Pulaski Heights Assembly Hall, Mount St. Mary Academy, and the original headquarters site of the Allied Telephone Company (the earliest incarnation of Alltel and Alltel's later spinoff, Windstream Communications).

Neighborhoods

The Heights

"The Heights" is the northernmost section of Pulaski Heights and has been long considered to be one of the most affluent neighborhoods in Little Rock, as it is home to many established, old-monied patrician families. Many large, majestic homes line the streets of The Heights, especially in its historic Edge Hill and Prospect Terrace additions, which were primarily first developed in the 1920s. The neighborhood has been home to the exclusive Country Club of Little Rock since the club's founding in 1902, and its commercial areas offer a number of fashionable shopping and dining destinations. Administrative offices for the Arkansas Symphony Orchestra and Roman Catholic Diocese of Little Rock are located at St. John's Center on N. Tyler Street. A variety of architectural styles can be found in The Heights representing the decades from its earliest settlement to the present day.

One early attraction of The Heights was Forest Park, developed in 1904 soon after the Little Rock Traction and Electric Company introduced streetcar service into Pulaski Heights in 1903. The park, located at the end of the Pulaski Heights streetcar line, was intended to increase ridership and income for the company, especially on weekends; it was bounded by Kavanaugh Boulevard (then Prospect Avenue) on the south, "V" Street on the north, N. Taylor Street on the east, and University Avenue (then N. Hayes Street) on the west.  The main entrance into the park was situated approximately where N. Pierce Street crosses Kavanaugh Boulevard today.  Special features and attractions offered at the park included a promenade and gardens, a dance pavilion, a bandstand  for band and vocal concerts, a small zoo, a figure-eight railroad, a merry-go-round, an aerial swing, a "laughing gallery," a shooting gallery, refreshment stands, a special track for horseracing, and a large block-long pool fed by artesian wells for swimming; the pool was sited next to Kavanaugh Boulevard approximately where the present Heights Theater office building (named after the former neighborhood Heights film theater) is found today.   Also located on the grounds was a streetcar barn.  A white-stucco auditorium, designed in the early Mission architectural style, could seat up to 1,500 persons.  Probably the largest entertainment ever held at Forest Park was one of several "last" dramatic performances by the famous actress Sarah Bernhardt, which reportedly drew a crowd of some 3,000 attendees.  Undoubtedly, the most spectacular entertainment offered at the park were the Sunday ascensions of an acrobatic balloonist who performed from a parachute-supported trapeze.

In 1939, the park was closed and its land sold, although its name is preserved today by the neighborhood Forest Park Elementary School and the Forest Park Station of the United States Postal Service.  It also lives on in the fond memories of many older residents.

After the park's closure, its land was subdivided and platted, and the area was rechristened as "Forest Heights."  (The not too distant eponymous Forest Heights Middle School brandishes the newer name.) Following the Second World War many small, modest "Brayle Homes" (named after a local developer) were constructed on the former park land; these were especially intended for purchase by returning war veterans eager to start new families and begin post-war "nest-building."  A large number of Brayle-type homes can still be found today in Cammack Village, a small separately incorporated enclave that immediately borders The Heights to its west.

In recent years, in what has become a matter of controversy, many of the former Brayle Homes in Forest Heights have been razed and replaced by larger homes, some of which have been disparagingly described by critics as "McMansions"; surviving smaller homes are then overshadowed (some would say overwhelmed) by the latter type of new adjoining structures.  While there have been discussions about instituting a Heights Municipal Historic Preservation District to limit the number of demolitions in Forest Heights, no such district has yet been created.

Hillcrest
"Hillcrest" is the southernmost section of Pulaski Heights.  It also encompasses the oldest and most historic portions of Pulaski Heights. In 1891 a group of investors primarily from Michigan, led by Henry F. Auten and Edgar E. Moss, incorporated the Pulaski Heights Land Company. Sale of residential lots by the company and subsequent construction of homes began here in the 1890s, and on some blocks examples of the early Queen Anne and Colonial Revival architectural styles can still be found. Also located here are the former Pulaski Heights Town Hall and Assembly Hall buildings and one of the oldest educational institutions in Arkansas—Mount St. Mary Academy—a Catholic girls' school.

As with The Heights, Hillcrest also is the location of some very large, stately, and imposing historic homes; many of these can be found along Hillcrest's Midland Street and other streets in its Midland Hills addition: Ridgeview Court, Crystal Court, Linwood Court, and Colonial Court.  Similar historic, stately homes can be found along portions of its Kavanaugh Boulevard, S. Lookout Road, and Woodlawn Drive; and along its Hill Road, where the former residence of the late Winthrop Rockefeller, Governor of Arkansas, can be found.  Most typically, many blocks in Hillcrest contain an eclectic and pleasing mix of various early twentieth-century architectural styles, with larger homes and charming cottages and bungalows interspersed together.

In order to encourage preservation of Hillcrest's unique historic character and heritage, the Hillcrest National Historic District was established in 1990, with its borders soon being expanded in 1992.  After expansion, the national historic district now consists of circa 707 acres of land, bounded by Markham Street and Lee Avenue on the south, N. Lookout Road and Evergreen Drive on the north, N. Woodrow Street on the east, and N. Harrison Street on the west.

Moreover, also to help secure the neighborhood's attractiveness, the City of Little Rock has established a Hillcrest Municipal Design Overlay District, which specifies height and set-back requirements for new structures and renovation of existing structures.

Little Rock's first streetcar system once extended into Hillcrest, with its entry into the neighborhood being at the current intersection of Markham Street and Kavanaugh Boulevard in the Stifft Station area of Arkansas's capital; the streetcar line then followed Kavanaugh Boulevard through Pulaski Heights up to the line's ending at Forest Park. The streetcars, over time, aided in the growth of Pulaski Heights and made possible its linking to Little Rock. Uniting the two municipal entities increasingly seemed to make sense and was finally achieved when the citizens of Pulaski Heights voted to merge into the City of Little Rock on January 4, 1916, in part to obtain better fire protection.  Although no longer a separately incorporated municipality, residents of Pulaski Heights, including both The Heights and Hillcrest, have retained a strong sense of separate identity.  In an era in which so much of new urban housing consists of sterile suburban tract developments filled with soulless, cookie-cutter residential structures, Pulaski Heights remains in the present what it was in the past, a green and leafy island in the midst of a city, truly an island of serenity, a cherished community that retains still the feel of a close-knit and supportive small town.

External links

 Historic information on Little Rock and Pulaski Heights, from the Little Rock City Manager's official web page

Former municipalities in Arkansas
Neighborhoods in Little Rock, Arkansas